The Penny Pool is a 1937 British comedy film directed by George Black and starring Douglas Wakefield, Billy Nelson and Chuck O'Neil. It was made at Highbury Studios.

Cast

References

Bibliography
 Low, Rachael. Filmmaking in 1930s Britain. George Allen & Unwin, 1985.
 Wood, Linda. British Films, 1927-1939. British Film Institute, 1986.

External links

1937 films
British comedy films
British black-and-white films
1937 comedy films
Films directed by George Black
Films shot at Highbury Studios
Films set in England
Films shot in Greater Manchester
1930s English-language films
1930s British films